Mille Heick Hundahl (born 21 September 1990) is a Danish female handballer who plays for Ringkøbing Håndbold.

International honours
EHF Cup: 
Finalist: 2011, 2017

References

1990 births
Living people
People from Thisted
Danish female handball players
Expatriate handball players
Danish expatriate sportspeople in Germany
Danish expatriate sportspeople in Norway
Sportspeople from the North Jutland Region